Micaiah Diondae "Dion" Glover (born October 22, 1978) is an American former professional basketball player who played in the National Basketball Association (NBA). He is currently an assistant coach for the Grand Rapids Drive of the NBA G League, He was also a member of the BIG3 basketball league's inaugural championship team, "Trilogy".

Basketball career
A McDonald's All-American, the 6'5" shooting guard Glover was selected by the Atlanta Hawks with the 20th overall pick of the 1999 NBA draft, from Georgia Tech. He played for the Hawks until February 2004, posting career-high averages in 2003–04: 10 points, four rebounds and two assists, with the team failing to make the playoffs.

After being waived by the Hawks, Glover played with the Toronto Raptors, then appeared in seven regular season games with the San Antonio Spurs, during the 2004–05 season.

On December 5, 2005, he was waived by the Houston Rockets (no competitive games played), and played overseas in Turkey, Lebanon, Israel and the Dominican Republic before retiring.

Outside basketball
Glover created the Dion Glover Foundation in 2000. A non-profit organization, it operates only on the support of charitable contributions and donations for educational, medical and scientific purposes, all being devoted to youth aid and development.

References

External links
NBA.com profile
Stats at BasketballReference
Dion Glover foundation website

1978 births
Living people
African-American basketball players
American expatriate basketball people in Canada
American expatriate basketball people in Israel
American men's basketball players
Atlanta Hawks draft picks
Atlanta Hawks players
Basketball coaches from Georgia (U.S. state)
Basketball players from Marietta, Georgia
Big3 players
Georgia Tech Yellow Jackets men's basketball players
Goodwill Games medalists in basketball
Grand Rapids Drive coaches
Ironi Nahariya players
McDonald's High School All-Americans
Parade High School All-Americans (boys' basketball)
San Antonio Spurs players
Shooting guards
Sportspeople from Marietta, Georgia
Toronto Raptors players
Competitors at the 1998 Goodwill Games
Al Riyadi Club Beirut basketball players
21st-century African-American sportspeople
20th-century African-American sportspeople
American men's 3x3 basketball players